Digitivalva delaireae is a moth of the family Acrolepiidae that is endemic to South Africa.

It is a potential biological control agent for Delairea odorata, the larval host plant. Mehelis et al., 2015 test the moth's food preferences and find a strong preference for D.odorata and against any vulnerable native plants in California and Oregon, making this a good biocontrol especially for those areas.

References

Acrolepiidae
Moths described in 2002
Endemic moths of South Africa